Bahundangi was a village development committee in Jhapa District in the Province No. 1 of South-Eastern Nepal. From 2017, this VDC is officially merged by Government with Mechinagar Municipality

History 

Bahundangi, the name is believed to be founded by a Brahmin woman who was a very kind hearted and selfless. She spent all her life towards helping people and since she was Brahmin and every single person was very happy with her; they soon decided to pronounce the area as, “Bahundangi”. It is also believed that, she died of high fever at an age about 57 and was buried near the river in Bahundangi and today it is also known as, “Bahunijhoda” which also means the River of Brahmin. Arjun kumar karki is new chairman of Mechinagar 4

Economy 

At early time, a weekly market has been scheduled on every Thursday where all the Vendors from many different places comes in Bahundangi to sell their products such as, Clothes, Cosmetics, Vegetables and other basic needs. It helps the people to avail themselves of all the basic needs without going anywhere. Also, many Traders from native country, "India" also comes here in Bahnundangi to sell or buy products.
This trend has been followed by the native of Bahundangi for more than 100 years. The majority of the people are farmers, mostly cultivating rice, tea, Areca nuts, ginger, Mushroom etc. Because of its open border most of the people have free access to India where they go for Trading Goods, Shopping and medication to the adjoining Indian market Naxalbari. To and fro illegal trade between the two areas is also present mostly in Areca nuts, ginger, paddy and timber. Many people here are working in Government and Private sectors and more than 2% of people are working in the Indian and British Army.

Demography 

The total population is 22897 according to 2001 census and the major ethnicity living here are Brahmins, Cheetri, Newar, Magar, Marwari, Rai, Limbu, etc.

Transportation 

Transportation is an important means for Trading goods. Since, Bahundangi lies at the border of India, people mostly uses Trucks, Tractors to trade their goods to India and vice versa. There are several Buses that directly runs from Bahundangi to Kathmandu, the capital city of Nepal on a daily basis. Also, several Buses and Cabs are available that runs from Bahundagi and connects to major cities like, Kakarvitta, Birtamode, Biratnagar, Dharan etc.

Climate 

Bahundangi which lies at the bank of Mechi River and near Illam District has a Moderate Climate. The average Temperature in summer is recorded as 33 °C and 6 °C in Winter Season.

Sports 

Bahundangi Jaycess had organized an invitational football tournament on 30 August 2012 (14 Bhadra 2069) in Bahundangi. The participating teams were Munal Club (Host Team) Birtamod Youth Club, APF Jhapa, Morang XI, Sunsari XI, UKFC Darjeeling and SAI Academy Siliguri.

Recently, Bahundangi Youth Club has organized "Late Fanda Singh Pandey Memorial Knockout Football Tournament" in the memory of Fanda Singh Pandey, the founding chairperson of Bahundangi Youth Club from 17th to 24th of Jestha 2075. The participating teams were Bahundangi Youth Club (Host Team), Sanischare Youth Club, New Star Youth Club, Munal Club, Birtamode United, APF Padajungi, Kakarvitta Football Training Centre & Damak Fc.

From very early times, Bahundangi is most rewarded VDC for sports among VDC's in Jhapa.

References

http://www.goalnepal.com/news.php?id=8632

Populated places in Jhapa District